Brighouse Rangers was a rugby league club in Brighouse, West Yorkshire, England.

The club was involved in the meeting at the George Hotel, Huddersfield in 1895, and after the schism became founder members of the Northern Rugby Football Union (now Rugby Football League), playing for eleven seasons from 1895–96 to 1905–06.

After a break, a new club, also called Brighouse Rangers, appeared in 1915 and played in the Emergency War Leagues in 1915–16, 1916–17, 1917–18 and 1918–19.

History

Early history 
Brighouse Rangers Football Club were founded in the 1870s, and joined the RFU in 1879.

After the 1890-91 season, Brighouse along with other Yorkshire Senior clubs Batley, Bradford, Dewsbury, Halifax, Huddersfield, Hull, Hunslet, Leeds, Liversedge, Manningham and Wakefield decided that they wanted their own county league starting in 1891 along the lines of a similar competition that had been played in Lancashire. The clubs wanted full control of the league but the Yorkshire Rugby Football Union would not sanction the competition as it meant giving up control of rugby football to the senior clubs.

In 1895, on 20 April, Brighouse Rangers won "T'owd Tin Pot", beating Morley R.F.C. 16–4 in the Yorkshire Cup Final at Headingley, Leeds before a crowd of in the region of 20,000.

Northern Union

Brighouse Rangers, like many other clubs from Lancashire (and Yorkshire), had suffered punishment by the RFU for "broken time" payments. After their annual general meeting in London, the RFU issued a decree banning the playing of rugby at grounds where entrance fees were charged, and so Brighouse Rangers, represented by H H Waller, attended a meeting at The George Hotel, Huddersfield, together with the representatives of 21 other clubs, and agreed to form a Northern Rugby Football Union.

After the Great Schism in 1895, Brighouse Rangers were one of the founder members of the new league and the same H H Waller of Brighouse Rangers was elected the first Northern Rugby Football Union chairman.

In the first season 1895–96 the league consisted of 22 clubs and Brighouse Rangers, continuing their recent Rugby Union form, finished in 5th position.

In season 1896–97 the league was divided into Yorkshire and Lancashire. Brighouse Rangers, playing in the former section, finished in 1st position out of 16 teams, 2 points ahead of second placed Manningham and a full eight points above third place Halifax. Brighouse Rangers were crowned Yorkshire Champions.

In the following four seasons, still in the Yorkshire section, seasons 1897–98, 1898–99, 1899–1900 & 1900–01 the club finished in 13th, 10th and 12th before moving up to a mid-table 7th in the respective seasons, each time out of the 16 clubs.

For the next season, 1901–02 the top seven clubs in each of the County Senior Leagues decided to break from the rest of the clubs and form "The Northern Rugby League". This is the first time these terms had been used. Brighouse Rangers, after finishing 7th (and beating Hull Kingston Rovers team with the same points by a better points scoring difference of 6), were included to this first division.

Brighouse Rangers finishing 14th and bottom with a playing record of 5 points (4 wins and 1 draw) out of 26 matches played.

The Rugby League made yet another change to the league structure for the next 1902–03 by renaming the top league as the 1st Division and increasing the number of clubs to 18, thus preventing any threatened relegations. Brighouse remained in the first division. In this following season, Brighouse Rangers again finished bottom out of the 18 teams, but this time only 2 points adrift of second bottom St. Helens and 8 points away from third bottom Wigan. This time both Brighouse Rangers and St. Helens were relegated.

For the next two seasons 1903–04 and 1904–05, Brighouse Rangers in the 2nd Division where they finished 6th out of 17 and then 11th out of 14 respectively.

The following season 1905–06 the two leagues were combined into one. Also, clubs arranged all their own fixtures with the condition that any team they played they did so twice, both home and away. This meant that the league positions were decided on a % basis (i.e. the actual points gained divided by the number of points possible if the club had won every game – the answer multiplied by a hundred). In this, Brighouse Rangers' last season, they finished bottom equal with Morecambe, bottom with 8 points out of a possible 52 and bottom with a 15.38% winning percentage.

At their annual general meeting in summer 1906 Brighouse Rangers took the decision to disband.

Successor clubs
After a break, another club with the same name Brighouse Rangers appeared during the First World War and played in the Emergency War League in season 1915–16, 1916–17, 1917–18 and the 1918–19 (Jan) wartime league but not in the shortened 1919 (Feb – May) Victory League.

Brighouse Rugby League club have reformed numerous times since. The current club are amateurs Brighouse Rangers ARLFC.

In the 1970s Brighouse Rangers (ARLFC) were reformed by former Luddenden and Ovenden player Jeff Greenwood and former Bradford Northern player John Chase they played at Wellholme Park, near the Brighouse Cricket Club. Towards the end of the new millennium 2000, Tesco bought the site including the Brighouse ARLFC clubhouse and with the money, the club built a new ground on Russell Way, off Bradford Road. As at 2022 they play in the Premier Div,  Yorkshire League also run a ladies team and a number of age group teams .

Honours
Yorkshire League: 1
1896–97

Club name
According to the official Rugby League records the Club was called Brighouse Rangers Some sites and books refer to the club as Brighouse Rovers though.

Player earning international caps while at Brighouse Rangers
 William "Billy" Nicholl (b 30/10/1868 in Rastrick — d 10/04/1922 in Brighouse)) played for England, in 1892 against Wales, and Scotland and for Brighouse Rangers, at both Rugby Union and Rugby League.

Ground
The club's first ground was at Fink Hill. In 1883 they moved to Waterloo Road, Lane Head (now the site of St Andrews Junior School and adjacent allotments), where they stayed until their demise in 1906.

Records

Club league performance

Club trophies 
 Yorkshire Cup (Rugby Union) winners: 1895
 Brighouse Rangers were the first Champions of the 1896–97 Yorkshire Senior Competition.

Club league record 

Heading Abbreviations
Pl = Games played; W = Win; D = Draw; L = Lose; PF = Points for; PA = Points against; Diff = Points difference (+ or -); Pts = League points
League points: for win = 2; for draw = 1; for loss = 0.

Several fixtures and results 
The following a selection of Brighouse Rangers' fixtures in the seasons in which they played (semi) professional Rugby League:-

Heading Abbreviations
CC Rx = Challenge Cup Round x; TSC = Yorkshire Senior Competition;

See also 
 T'owd Tin Pot
 British rugby league system
 1895–96 Northern Rugby Football Union season
 1896–97 Northern Rugby Football Union season
 1897–98 Northern Rugby Football Union season
 1898–99 Northern Rugby Football Union season
 1899–1900 Northern Rugby Football Union season
 1900–01 Northern Rugby Football Union season
 1901–02 Northern Rugby Football Union season
 1902–03 Northern Rugby Football Union season
 1903–04 Northern Rugby Football Union season
 1904–05 Northern Rugby Football Union season
 1905–06 Northern Rugby Football Union season
 The Great Schism – Rugby League View
 The Great Schism – Rugby Union View
 Rugby league county leagues
 William "Billy" Nicholl
 List of defunct rugby league clubs
 Brighouse Rangers

References

External links 
 1896–97 Northern Rugby Football Union season at wigan.rlfans.com
 Hull&Proud Fixtures & Results 1896/1897
 Widnes Vikings – One team, one passion Season In Review – 1896–97
 Saints Heritage Society
 rugbyleagueproject: Swinton Lions
 Warington History
 Morley RUFC – History
 RL All time records
 International Statistics at scrum.com
 Search for "Nicholl" at rugbyleagueproject.org

Rugby league teams in West Yorkshire
Defunct rugby league teams in England
Sport in Calderdale
Brighouse
Rugby clubs established in 1877
Rugby clubs disestablished in 1906
1906 disestablishments in England
Founder members of the Northern Rugby Football Union
Women's rugby league teams in England
1877 establishments in England